Zedge is a content distribution platform that provides consumers with a way to personalize their mobile devices. The platform offers a variety of customization options, including ringtones, wallpapers, home screen app icons, widgets, and notification sounds.

Amateur and professional artists can launch a virtual storefront in Zedge allowing them to market and sell their content to Zedge's global user base. As of February 2, 2023, the Zedge app has been downloaded over 436 million times and has approximately 30 million monthly active users. It has consistently ranked among the top 60 most popular free apps in Google Play in the US. In 2013, Zedge was recognized as one of Time's Best 50 Android Apps.

In recent years, the company has expanded its offerings with the launch of Shortz, a mobile app, in 2019. In 2021, Zedge acquired online emoji encyclopedia Emojipedia. In 2022, Zedge acquired photography and mobile gaming company GuruShots.

In 2023 for Russian users the site became unreachable by the administration.

History
Zedge was founded by Tom Arnøy, Kenneth Sundnes, and Paul Shaw in Norway in 2003. In June 2016, Zedge's parent company was spun off from IDT as a publicly traded company listed on the New York Stock Exchange. As of 2018 it has offices in Trondheim, Vilnius, and New York City.

References

Search engine software
Software companies established in 2003
Companies based in Trondheim
Norwegian companies established in 2003